Unkoku Togan (雲谷 等顔, 1547–1618) was a Japanese painter.

He was born into a privileged family in Nagasaki, the second son of Hara Naoie, lord of Nokomi Castle in Hizen province.

Starting as an artist of the Kanō school, Togan's work soon took its inspiration from the style of Sesshu. He painted realistic landscapes, usually ink on paper.

He worked under Lord Mori of Yamaguchi Prefecture. Later, he became a Buddhist priest and abbot of Unkoku-an Temple.  He died in Yamaguchi.

External links
Momoyama, Japanese Art in the Age of Grandeur, an exhibition catalog from The Metropolitan Museum of Art (fully available online as PDF), which contains material on Unkoku Togan
Bridge of dreams: the Mary Griggs Burke collection of Japanese art, a catalog from The Metropolitan Museum of Art Libraries (fully available online as PDF), which contains material on Unkoku Togan (see index)

Japanese painters
1547 births
1618 deaths
Buddhist artists
Japanese Buddhist clergy